The Visuddhimagga (Pali; English: The Path of Purification), is the 'great treatise' on Buddhist practice and Theravāda Abhidhamma written by Buddhaghosa approximately in the 5th century in Sri Lanka. It is a manual condensing and systematizing the 5th century understanding and interpretation of the Buddhist path as maintained by the elders of the Mahavihara Monastery in Anuradhapura, Sri Lanka.

It is considered the most important Theravada text of outside of the Tipitaka canon of scriptures, and is described as "the hub of a complete and coherent method of exegesis of the Tipitaka."

Background

Structure
The structure of the Visuddhimagga is based on the Ratha-vinita Sutta ("Relay Chariots Discourse," MN 24), which describes the progression from the purity of discipline to the final destination of nibbana in seven steps. The Visuddhimagga'''s material also strongly resembles the material found in an earlier treatise called the Vimuttimagga (c. 1st or 2nd century).

Reflecting later developments
The Visuddhimagga's doctrine reflects Theravada Abhidhamma scholasticism, which includes several innovations and interpretations not found in the earliest discourses (suttas) of the Buddha. Buddhaghosa's Visuddhimagga includes non-canonical instructions on Theravada meditation, such as "ways of guarding the mental image (nimitta)," which point to later developments in Theravada meditation.

Kasina-meditation
The Visuddhimagga concerns kasina-meditation, a form of concentration-meditation in which the mind is focused on a (mental) object. According to Thanissaro Bhikkhu, "[t]he text then tries to fit all other meditation methods into the mold of kasina practice, so that they too give rise to countersigns, but even by its own admission, breath meditation does not fit well into the mold." In its emphasis on kasina-meditation, the Visuddhimagga departs from the Pali Canon, in which dhyana is the central meditative practice, indicating that what "jhana means in the commentaries is something quite different from what it means in the Canon."

Non-Theravada influences
Kalupahana notes that the Visuddhimagga contains "some metaphysical speculations, such as those of the Sarvastivadins, the Sautrantikas, and even the Yogacarins". Kalupahana comments:

Contents

Summary
The Visuddhimagga is composed of three sections, which discuss: 1) Sīla (ethics or discipline); 2) Samādhi (meditative concentration); 3) Pañña (understanding or wisdom).
 The first section (part 1) explains the rules of discipline, and the method for finding a correct temple to practice, or how to meet a good teacher.
 The second section (part 2) describes samatha practice, object by object (see Kammatthana for the list of the forty traditional objects). It mentions different stages of concentration.
 The third section (part 3-7) is a description of the five skandhas (aggregates), ayatanas, the Four Noble Truths, dependent origination (Pratitya-samutpada), and the practice of vipassana through the development of wisdom. It emphasizes different forms of knowledge emerging because of the practice. This part shows a great analytical effort specific to Buddhist philosophy.

Seven Stages of Purification
This comparison between practice and "seven relay chariots" points at the goal. Each purity is needed to attain the next. They are often referred to as the "Seven Stages of Purification" (satta-visuddhi):
 Purification of Conduct (sīla-visuddhi)
 Purification of Mind (citta-visuddhi)
 Purification of View (ditthi-visuddhi)
 Purification by Overcoming Doubt (kankha-vitarana-visuddhi)
 Purification by Knowledge and Vision of What Is Path and Not Path (maggamagga-ñanadassana-visuddhi)
 Purification by Knowledge and Vision of the Course of Practice (patipada-ñanadassana-visuddhi)
 Knowledge of contemplation of rise and fall (udayabbayanupassana-nana)
 Knowledge of contemplation of dissolution (bhanganupassana-nana)
 Knowledge of appearance as terror (bhayatupatthana-nana)
 Knowledge of contemplation of danger (adinavanupassana-nana)
 Knowledge of contemplation of dispassion (nibbidanupassana-nana)
 Knowledge of desire for deliverance (muncitukamyata-nana)
 Knowledge of contemplation of reflection (patisankhanupassana-nana)
 Knowledge of equanimity about formations (sankharupekka-nana)
 Conformity knowledge (anuloma-nana)
 Purification by Knowledge and Vision (ñanadassana-visuddhi)
 Change of lineage
 The first path and fruit
 The second path and fruit
 The third path and fruit
 The fourth path and fruit

The "Purification by Knowledge and Vision" is the culmination of the practice, in four stages leading to liberation and Nirvana. The emphasis in this system is on understanding the three marks of existence, dukkha, anatta, anicca. This emphasis is recognizable in the value that is given to vipassana over samatha in the contemporary vipassana movement.

Siddhis
According to scholars, the Visuddhimagga is one of the extremely rare texts within the enormous literatures of various forms of Jainism, Buddhism, and Hinduism to give explicit details about how spiritual masters were thought to actually manifest supernormal abilities. Abilities such as flying through the air, walking through solid obstructions, diving into the ground, walking on water and so forth are performed by changing one element, such as earth, into another element, such as air. The individual must master kasina meditation before this is possible. Dipa Ma, who trained via the Visuddhimagga, was said to demonstrate these abilities.

Influence

Traditional Theravada
The Visuddhimagga is considered the most important Theravada text outside of the Tipitaka canon of scriptures, along with the Milindapañha. According to Nanamoli Bhikkhu, the Visuddhimagga is "the hub of a complete and coherent method of exegesis of the Tipitaka, using the ‘Abhidhamma method' as it is called. And it sets out detailed practical instructions for developing purification of mind."

Contemporary Theravada
The Visuddhimagga is one of the main texts on which contemporary vipassana method (and the vipassana movement itself) is based, together with the Satipatthana Sutta. Yet, its emphasis on kasina-meditation and its claim of the possibility of "dry insight" has also been criticised and rejected by some contemporary Theravada scholars and vipassana-teachers.

According to Thanissaro Bhikkhu, "the Visuddhimagga uses a very different paradigm for concentration from what you find in the Canon." Bhante Henepola Gunaratana also notes that what "the suttas say is not the same as what the Visuddhimagga says [...] they are actually different," leading to a divergence between a [traditional] scholarly understanding and a practical understanding based on meditative experience. Gunaratana further notes that Buddhaghosa invented several key meditation terms which are not to be found in the suttas, such as "parikamma samadhi (preparatory concentration), upacara samadhi (access concentration), appanasamadhi (absorption concentration)." Gunaratana also notes that Buddhaghosa's emphasis on kasina-meditation is not to be found in the suttas, where dhyana is always combined with mindfulness.

Bhikkhu Sujato has argued that certain views regarding Buddhist meditation expounded in the Visuddhimagga are a "distortion of the Suttas" since it denies the necessity of jhana. The Australian monk Shravasti Dhammika is also critical of contemporary practice based on this work. He concludes that Buddhaghosa did not believe that following the practice set forth in the Visuddhimagga will really lead him to Nirvana, basing himself on the postscript to the Visuddhimagga:

However, according to the Burmese scholar Venerable Pandita, the postscript to the Visuddhimagga is not by Buddhaghosa.

See also
 Buddhaghosa
 Vimuttimagga
 Patisambhidamagga
 Śīla
 Samatha
 Vipassanā

Editions

Printed Pali editions
 Caroline A. F. Rhys Davids, Visuddhimagga Pali Text Society, London, 1920 & 1921. (Latin script) 
 Warren, H. C. & Kosambi, D. D. Visuddhimagga of Buddhaghosâcariya, Harvard Oriental Series, Vol. 41, 1950.(Latin script) 
 Hewavitarne Bequest edition, Colombo, Sri Lanka (Sinhala script)

South-East Asia
Sinhala
 Sinhala Visuddhimargaya, Pandita Matara Sri Dharmavamsa Sthavira, Matara, Sri Lanka, 1953 (Sinhala)
Burmese
 Hanthawaddy Press edition, Rangoon, Myanmar (Burmese script)
Thai
 Royal Siamese edition, Bangkok, Thailand (Thai script)
 คัมภีร์วิสุทธิมรรค (Khamphi Wisutthimak),  Somdej Phra Buddhacarya (Ard Asabhamahathera), sixth edition. Bangkok: Mahachulalongkornrajvidyalaya University, B.E. 2548 (2005). 

English translations
 The Path of Purity, Pe Maung (trans.), Pali Text Society, London, 3 vols., 1922–31 Part 1: Of Virtue, Part 2: Of Concentration & Part 3: Of Understanding
 Bhikkhu Nyanamoli (trans.), The Path of Purification, Visuddhimagga, Buddhist Publication Society, Kandy 2011, .
 Buddhist Meditation, Edward Conze (trans.), NB: Partial translation, 2002, 

Other European translations
 Der Weg zur Reinheit, Nyanatiloka & Verlag Christiani (trans.), Konstanz, 1952 (German)
 Le chemin de la pureté, Christian Maës, Fayard 2002 (Français), 

Notes

References

Sources

 

 

 

 
 
  
 . 

 Thanissaro Bhikkhu (trans.) (1999). Ratha-vinita Sutta: Relay Chariots (MN 24).

External links
 Mahasi Sayadaw,  The Progress of Insight (Visuddhiñana-katha)]
 Ve. Matara Sri Nanarama, The Seven Stages of Purification & The Insight Knowledges
 The entire Visuddhimagga: The Path of Purification by Bhadantacariya Buddhaghosa tr. by Ñānamoli Thera
 The Path of Purification (Visuddhimagga) by Bhadantacariya Buddhaghosa[https://www.bps.lk/library-search-select.php?id=bp622s Guide through the Visuddhimagga by U Dhammaratana
Vimuttimagga and Visuddhimagga by P. V. Bapat

Theravada Buddhist texts
Pali Buddhist texts
Buddhist commentaries
Stage theories
Buddhist meditation
Buddhist stages of enlightenment
Yoga texts and documentation
Hatha yoga texts